Gutenberg! The Musical! is a musical written by Scott Brown and Anthony King. Brown and King developed the show at the Upright Citizens Brigade Theatre in New York City, where it ran for over a year. The show was part of the 2005 and 2006 New York Musical Theatre Festival and ran at the Jermyn Street Theatre in London in January 2006.

Gutenberg! The Musical! opened off-Broadway on December 3, 2006 at 59E59 and then transferred to The Actors' Playhouse on January 16, 2007.  The production closed on May 6, 2007. The production was directed by Alex Timbers with music directed by T.O. Sterrett and starred Chris Fitzgerald and Jeremy Shamos.

History
The show was originally produced as a 45-minute one-act, workshopped at the Upright Citizens Brigade Theatre in New York and the 2005 New York Musical Theatre Festival, starring the authors, Scott Brown and Anthony King.  These early versions of the show were directed by Charlie Todd and Music Directed and Accompanied by Barry Wyner.

The full two-act version of the show premiered at The Jermyn Street Theatre in London in January 2006.  That production was Music Directed and Accompanied by Michael Roulston and also starred the authors, Scott Brown and Anthony King.

In September 2006, Chris Fitzgerald and Jeremy Shamos were cast in the roles of Bud and Doug for the 2006 New York Musical Theatre Festival.  That production was directed by Dave Mowers and Music Directed and Accompanied by Matt Castle and won awards for "Best Book" and "Best Performance."

The November 2006 Off-Broadway production was directed by Alex Timbers and played at 59E59 Theaters in midtown before moving to a six-month run at the Actor's Playhouse. That production was nominated for Best Musical at the Lortel and Outer Critic's Circle Awards, as well as Best Book and Best Director of a Musical at the Drama Desk Awards. David Turner and Darren Goldstein replaced the original cast.

In November 2007, the first regional production worldwide was produced by Plan-B Theatre Company in Salt Lake City, Utah. It was directed by Jerry Rapier, Choreographed by Colleen Lewis, Musically Directed by Jeffrey Price, Stage Managed by Jennifer Freed and featured Kirt Bateman as Doug and Jay Perry as Bud.  The production was named 'Best Theatre Production' by Salt Lake City Weekly, 'Best Play' by Q Salt Lake and 'Best Comedy' by the Deseret News. After myriad requests, this production was revived June 3–19, 2011 as Plan-B Theatre Company's contribution to the Musicals On Main Series at the Egyptian Theatre in Park City, Utah. The production remained intact other than Sean Sekino became the Musical Director.

In September 2008, Gutenberg! The Musical! made its West Coast premiere at Strawberry Theatre Workshop in Seattle. Starring Troy Fischnaller (Doug) and MJ Sieber (Bud), with piano accompaniment by Don Darryl Rivera, and directed by Greg Carter. "Fischnaller's Doug is giddily foul-mouthed with self-congratulation, and Sieber has a twinkle in his eye even as he works himself into a sweaty state of breathless zeal. Both performers toil feverishly to keep director Greg Carter's pace for the show—a five-shot-espresso-with-a-Red-Bull-chaser momentum from start to finish. The brakes are completely disabled on this speeding clown car of inside theater jokes."

In February 2009 the show made its international debut at the Seymour Centre in Sydney, Australia.

In May 2015, the show made its French-speaking debut at the Akteon Théâtre in Paris, France.

Plot 
The play is performed as a backer's audition by Bud Davenport and Doug Simon, the authors of a musical about Johannes Gutenberg, which they are pitching to producers who might put their show up on Broadway. Because the minimally-talented and starry-eyed authors don't have a cast or an orchestra, Bud and Doug play all of the roles themselves, wearing hats with the characters' names on them and frequently switching said hats to indicate different characters. Minimal props, such as a cardboard box, pencils, and a chair, are used as well.

Since Bud and Doug's research into the life of Gutenberg (aka a quick Google search) revealed that information on his life is "scant", they take a historical fiction approach, by which they mean that they just made stuff up.

In the play-within-a-play, Johann Gutenberg is a wine presser in the medieval German town of Schlimer, a happy and cheery place except for the fact that the town is horribly dirty and depressing and no one except Gutenberg can read. Intent on saving the townspeople from their own ignorance, Gutenberg turns his wine press into a printing press (he accomplishes this in one night). His beautiful (but dim) assistant Helvetica is in love with him, but Gutenberg is unaware of her feelings. Meanwhile, the show's villain, Monk, an evil monk who worships Satan, attempts to keep ignorance alive so he can control the townspeople through inaccurate readings of the Bible and seeks to destroy the printing press. The inept show-within-a-show parodies various musical theater conventions, such as the cheery opening number, a high-octane rock song for the act one finale, kicklines, emotional ballads and an irrelevant "charm song" about biscuits sung by two supporting characters.

Despite their ineptitude, Bud and Doug's high-energy and optimistic performance of their show may be enough to launch their dreams of stardom.

Musical numbers

Act I
"Prologue/Schlimmer"
"I Can't Read"
"Haunted German Wood"
"The Press Song"
"I Can't Read (Reprise)"
"Biscuits"
"What's The Word?"
"Stop The Press"
"Tomorrow Is Tonight"

Act II
"Second Prologue"
"Words, Words, Words"
"Monk With Me"
"Might As Well (Go To Hell)"
"Festival!"
"Finale"

Awards and nominations

Off-Broadway production

References

External links

Gutenberg's Travels

Off-Broadway musicals
2005 musicals
Plays based on real people
Cultural depictions of Johannes Gutenberg